Terrance Michael "Terry" Brunk (born December 12, 1964) is an American retired professional wrestler, better known by his ring name Sabu. He is known for his trademark style of hardcore wrestling, which he pioneered in his time with Extreme Championship Wrestling (ECW) from 1995 to 2000. He is a three-time World Heavyweight Champion having held the ECW World Heavyweight Championship twice and the NWA World Heavyweight Championship once.

Under the tutelage of his uncle Ed "The Sheik" Farhat, Brunk began his career wrestling in the North American independent scene in 1985 under the name of Sabu, before traveling to Japan, competing in Frontier Martial-Arts Wrestling (FMW) and New Japan Pro-Wrestling (NJPW), winning several championships, including the IWGP Junior Heavyweight Championship. He returned to the United States in 1995, briefly working for World Championship Wrestling (WCW), before beginning his most well-known stint in ECW, where he quickly became a fixture of the promotion. During his time in ECW, he became a two-time ECW World Heavyweight Champion and a one-time ECW World Television Champion. He would have both a feud and an alliance with The Tazmaniac, defeated him for the ECW FTW Championship and winning the ECW World Tag Team Championship with him. In 1997, Sabu began a tag team with Rob Van Dam, winning the ECW Tag Team Championship twice.

After leaving ECW, Sabu wrestled in several national promotions, winning the NWA World Heavyweight Championship in 2000. In 2006, he was hired by WWE as part of their new third brand, a rebooted version of ECW. Sabu would wrestle for WWE until he was fired in 2007. He also became a wrestler in Total Nonstop Action Wrestling (TNA, now Impact Wrestling) since the creation of the promotion in 2002.

Professional wrestling career

Early career (1985–1991) 
Brunk was trained by his uncle, Ed "The Sheik" Farhat, and was initially trained to be a technical wrestler. He began his wrestling career in 1985 in Farhat's promotion, Big Time Wrestling, and was billed as being from Saudi Arabia under the ring names "Sabu the Elephant Boy" (use of "The Elephant Boy" was later dropped) and "Terry S.R." (the "S.R." standing for "Sheik's Revenge"). During the 1980s, Brunk wrestled for various independent promotions in Memphis, Michigan, Ohio, Canada, and Hawaii. He was rarely billed under his real name, in order to avoid confusion with the similarly named Terry Funk, but has wrestled under his real name of Terry Brunk in Hawai'i.

United States Wrestling Association (1991) 
In 1991, Sabu made a few appearances for United States Wrestling Association as Samu. He feuded with Jeff Jarrett and Robert Fuller.

World Wrestling Federation (1993)
Sabu made three appearances for the World Wrestling Federation. He defeated Scott Taylor in a dark match before Monday Night Raw on October 18, 1993. He lost to Owen Hart the next night for a dark match at a Wrestling Challenge taping and on the October 20 defeated Scott Taylor again in a dark match at a WWF Superstars of Wrestling taping.

Frontier Martial–Arts Wrestling (1991–1994) 
In 1991, Sabu made his first tour of Japan with Frontier Martial–Arts Wrestling (FMW). While wrestling for FMW, Sabu received many of the scars on his arms and torso for which he became famous. Brunk cleared rumors that the scars were self-induced in a shoot interview with RF Video, confirming that they were a result of numerous hardcore matches he was involved in, including participating in over two dozen no-rope barbed wire death matches. In May 1992, Sabu teamed with his uncle, the Sheik, in a "Ring of Fire Deathmatch" against Atsushi Onita and Tarzan Goto. The match was set in a ring where the ropes were replaced with barbed wire with sheets soaked in gas wrapped around it. As the match started, the ring crew lit the sheets on fire using torches. They were in the ring for about a minute before all men got out of the ring due to the intense heat. The match ended with no winner. Sabu said in an interview that the ring burned for 19 hours.

Sabu often competed in Japanese hardcore matches, where he teamed with The Sheik, Tiger Jeet Singh and Horace Boulder. Sabu feuded with the likes of Tarzan Goto and Atsushi Onita in FMW. His final match in FMW was a loss to the debuting Hayabusa at the 1994 Summer Spectacular.

Eastern/Extreme Championship Wrestling (1993–1995)
Sabu debuted in Eastern Championship Wrestling in October 1993 at NWA Bloodfest. In his second match with the promotion, he defeated Shane Douglas for the ECW Heavyweight Championship.

Brunk revealed in a shoot promo and in the documentary film Forever Hardcore that in fact it was not Paul Heyman that brought him into Extreme Championship Wrestling (ECW) but that he was at the right place at the right time. He was referred by a friend to Tod Gordon. According to the storyline, Sabu, who at that time often arrived to the ring by his handler 911, was an uncontrollable madman strapped to a gurney and with a Hannibal Lecter-style face mask while trying to break free (he claimed to hate this part of his gimmick as he was normally tired before he started his match). Sabu could only be released from his bonds to wrestle his matches. Sabu also quickly became synonymous with table-breaking at this time; if a table was not broken during the match, Sabu would break a table with his own body after the bell had sounded, sometimes leading to 911 having to restrain Sabu during backstage interviews if a table was present.

One of the most notable aspects of Sabu's early career was his refusal to speak, a gimmick that he inherited from The Sheik (who never spoke English in public to protect kayfabe). In his early career, Sabu was billed as being from Saudi Arabia, or Bombay, India (in real life he is a second generation Lebanese American from a suburb of Detroit). In ECW, however, he was clearly heard speaking in the ring on several occasions and it was fairly common knowledge that Brunk was an American citizen from birth. This led to a joke at kayfabe's expense when Sabu began to be billed as hailing from "Bombay, Michigan".

The most significant matches during the early part of Sabu's career in ECW were defeating Terry Funk to win the ECW World Heavyweight Championship and the ECW World Television Championship in a title versus title dream partner tag team match. Also, he was a part in the three way dance for the ECW World Heavyweight Championship at The Night the Line Was Crossed, against Terry Funk and Shane Douglas, which went to a one-hour time limit draw and his tag team feud with The Public Enemy in which Sabu and his partner The Tazmaniac captured the ECW World Tag Team Championship in a double tables match. Another notable event occurred in April 1995 when, after being scheduled to compete in the main event of Three Way Dance for the ECW World Tag Team title, Sabu no–showed the event to accept a booking in Japan for New Japan Pro-Wrestling (NJPW), which led Paul Heyman to publicly and legitimately fire Sabu at the event. Sabu stated in the Forever Hardcore documentary that he by then had a career wrestling in Japan and now only wrestled once every so often for ECW; thus, he chose Japan over ECW.

New Japan Pro-Wrestling (1995) 
Sabu wrestled for New Japan Pro-Wrestling throughout 1995, making a total of 64 appearances. He made his debut on January 4 in the Tokyo Dome, teaming with Masahiro Chono to defeat Junji Hirata and Tatsumi Fujinami. Sabu and Chono teamed together on several more occasions to face Heisei Ishingun.

On May 3, 1995, Sabu defeated Koji Kanemoto in the Fukuoka Dome to win the IWGP Junior Heavyweight Championship. He lost the title to Kanemoto on June 14, 1995 in Tokyo's Nippon Budokan in a bout where Kanemoto's UWA World Welterweight Championship was also on the line. He went on to face Gran Hamada in a series of matches, culminating in Sabu defeating Gran Hamada to win the UWA World Junior Light Heavyweight Championship on November 23, 1995 in the Todoroki Arena in Kawasaki. He held the championship for just over a week, losing to El Samurai on December 1, 1995 in Niigata.

Sabu made his final appearance with NJPW on December 11, 1995 in Osaka, teaming with Hiro Saito to defeat Dean Malenko and Wild Pegasus.

World Championship Wrestling (1995)
Sabu made his WCW debut on the September 11, 1995 episode of WCW Monday Nitro against Alex Wright. Sabu won the match, but the decision was reversed when, after the match, he put Wright through a table. Sabu continued to wrestle some of the cruiserweights in WCW in the early days of the division, including a match against Mr. J.L. at Halloween Havoc. Sabu came out victorious against Mr. J.L. and following the match Sabu's uncle Sheik shot J.L. in the face with his trademark fireball. His last match in WCW was against Disco Inferno, which Sabu won.

Big Japan and All Japan Pro Wrestling (1996-1997) 
Sabu returned to Japan to work for Big Japan Pro Wrestling in March 1996. He had an 18-match winning streak first defeating Jason Knight on March 13 to June 4 losing to Kazuo Sakurada's Kendo Nagasaki.

He made his debut for All Japan Pro Wrestling in November 1996 teaming with Gary Albright. In 1997, he teamed with Rob Van Dam.

Return to ECW (1995–2000) 

Sabu returned to ECW on the 18th at November to Remember 1995, and eventually engaged in matches and feuds with the likes of Rob Van Dam, with whom he later teamed up with and won the ECW World Tag Team Championship twice. In the meantime, former tag team partner Tazmaniac (who had shortened his name to "Taz") began to publicly challenge Sabu at every given opportunity, but got no response. After a year of call-outs and insults from Taz, Heyman revealed that he had asked Sabu, as a friend, to ignore Taz's challenge. This standoff culminated in a grudge match at ECW's first pay-per-view, Barely Legal, which Taz won. Following the match, Taz's manager Bill Alfonso turned on him and sided with Sabu and Rob Van Dam, who then formed a tag team. Sabu and Taz continued to feud on and off for the remainder of Taz's ECW career.

Sabu was later included in the WWF invasion angle, in which ECW wrestlers invaded WWF's Monday Night Raw program and held ECW-style matches and angles on the show. One memorable moment occurred at this show when Sabu appeared during a match and prepared for an aerial move off the "R" in the "RAW" lettered entryway onto Team Taz members, but accidentally fell off the "R". This was not planned which led to Sabu landing on top of Team Taz members and becoming an inside joke between him and Taz backstage. This invasion angle also led to a heel turn for Sabu in ECW, along with Van Dam and Alfonso, who began promoting the virtues of the WWF product over ECW's. Sabu feuded with ECW loyalists Tommy Dreamer and The Sandman during this period.

One of Sabu's most infamous matches was the No-Rope barbed wire match with Terry Funk at Born to be Wired, a match which was promoted as being "too extreme even for ECW". In one of the most memorable moments in ECW history, Sabu attempted the "Air Sabu" corner splash on Funk, Terry moved and Sabu ended up colliding violently into the wire which tore open his biceps. He then asked his manager Bill Alfonso for some tape and after Alfonso went to get some Sabu began to tape the approximately 10 inch gash up. Funk has stated that, to this day, he has never seen anything like what Sabu did that night. The match ended with both men so badly tangled up together in the barbed wire that it took several ring technicians armed with wire cutters to free them from the predicament (on the DVD Bloodsport – ECW's Most Violent Matches released by World Wrestling Entertainment, Paul Heyman said that the match was "so gruesome, I never ever dared to schedule another one like it", and that they never had another Barbed-Wire match in ECW because "no one could top that one – and in good conscience, I never wanted anyone to try").

Brunk racked up an astounding catalog of injuries during his ECW tenure, including broken ribs, a broken jaw, and breaking his neck twice. The first time he broke his neck was during his match with Chris Benoit at the 1994 November to Remember. Benoit threw Sabu with the intention that he would take a flapjack bump, but Brunk attempted to turn mid-air and take a back body drop bump instead, which he was not able to do and landed on his head causing the injury. The other was during a match against Taz in December 1998, when Brunk took a Taz-Plex through a table and landed incorrectly. Brunk was able to recover from the neck injuries and return to wrestling, and he even wore a neck brace in his return match in the United States a month following the injury at Taz's hands; by Brunk's account, however, he started actively wrestling in Japan with his partner on a short tour a little over two weeks after that injury. Brunk departed from ECW for the final time in early 2000.

Independent circuit (2000-2002)
After leaving ECW, Sabu went to compete in the independent circuit. He worked for promotions such as Xtreme Pro Wrestling, IWA Mid-South, Stampede Wrestling, Border City Wrestling, and others. On April 29, 2000, he won a tournament for the vacated XPW World Heavyweight Championship defeating John Kronus in the first round, Damien Steele in the second and The Messiah in the finals. He was the only champion to defend the title outside of the States. He would hold the title for a year until it was taken away in May 2001 by Josh Lazie when Sabu was not present for an event. He would return to All Japan Pro Wrestling in 2000 as a singles competitor. In 2001, he competed against Abdullah the Butcher and Giant Kimala.

On July 8, 2001, he defeated Angel at ECW Reunion Show in Buffalo, New York. In 2002, he worked for Pro-Pain Pro Wrestling. He won the 3PW World Heavyweight Championship defeating Gary Wolfe on October 19. He would drop the title to Wolfe on December 28.

Return to Frontier Martial–Arts Wrestling (1997-2002)
Sabu returned to Frontier Martial-Arts Wrestling on December 22, 1997, when he defeated ECW rival The Sandman at Super Extreme Wrestling War 1997 at Tokyo's Korakuen Hall. Then on December 13, 1998, he and Rob Van Dam defeated the Dudley Boyz to retain the ECW World Tag Team Titles at ECW/FMW Supershow. He would team up with Super Leather in a few tag team matches during 1999.  
 		
On February 3, 2002, Sabu defeated former ECW wrestlers The Sandman and Vic Grimes in a three-way dance. The next day was his last match with FMW was when he teamed with Tetsuhiro Kuroda and lost to The Sandman and Kodo Fuyuki for the vacated WEW Tag Team titles. This would be the promotion last event as it went bankrupt on the 15th.

World Wrestling All-Stars (2002, 2003)
Sabu competed for the World Wrestling All-Stars (WWA) in a number of events during 2002 and 2003. This included four appearances on PPV and a number of memorable matches. His first appearance was at Revolution PPV in Las Vegas in February 2002. He faced Devon Storm in a hardcore match. He was defeated in this match after his manager Bill Alfonso accidentally hit him with a chair after Storm moved out the way. After the match Sabu and Storm continued to fight onto the ring entrance way. Sabu placed Storm on a table and leaped from the entrance way through Storm and the table. This feud continued on the next PPV, the Eruption, in Australia in April. Sabu fought Storm in a steel cage match. The action spilled out of the ring and the cage with Sabu gaining the victory after leaping from the top of the cage through Storm, who was placed on top of two tables on top of each other.

Next up Sabu took part in WWA European tour of November–December 2002. This included the Retribution PPV in Glasgow, which was broadcast two months later in February 2003. On this tour and PPV he fought former fellow ECW stars Perry Saturn and Simon Diamond in a three-way hardcore match. Sabu took the victory in each of these matches, usually gaining the pinfall over Diamond after Saturn left the match to defend his companion. His final appearance for the WWA came in their last PPV, The Reckoning, in New Zealand. During this tour he first fought Shane Douglas but due to injury he did not face him at the PPV. Instead, Douglas came to the ring and eventually allowed Joe E Legend to face Sabu instead. Sabu won this match, his second and last WWA match ever. When the All World Wrestling League began in April 2003 (a spin-off of Big Time Wrestling), which was run by Eddie & Tom Farhat, Sabu joined them for a while, before he left for another territory.

Total Nonstop Action Wrestling (2002–2006)

Early appearances and injury (2002–2004)
Sabu debuted in Total Nonstop Action Wrestling (TNA) on July 17, 2002, defeating Jerry "Malice" Tuite in a ladder match. The next week he faced Ken Shamrock in a ladder match which was declared a No Contest when Malice interfered.

In 2004, Sabu teamed with Raven to defeat Raven's former "Gathering" protégés, CM Punk and Julio Dinero. In March, he began feuding with Monty Brown and Abyss, who outnumbered him on several occasions after Raven failed to "watch his back". Eventually Raven challenged Sabu to an empty arena match to be held on June 9, but Sabu refused to wrestle him, claiming that he had promised his uncle, Ed "The Sheik" Farhat, that he would never fight Raven. Raven then waged a campaign against Sabu, disrespecting the memory of his uncle and assaulting Sabu's friend Sonjay Dutt, until Sabu finally broke and attacked him on July 23. Raven defeated Sabu on August 4, and a scheduled return match on August 18 was canceled after Sabu legitimately suffered a serious back injury.

While injured, Brunk contracted a virus and was hospitalized, sidelining him for ten months. On December 12, a benefit show, A Night of Appreciation for Sabu, was held by the AWWL to raise funds for him. The show was considered a success, raising enough money for Brunk to cover the costs of his medical care and he was able to make a full recovery. In his first match back from the injury in the AWWL/BTW, he defeated N8 Mattson. Sabu then appeared at Hardcore Homecoming, where he defeated Terry Funk and Shane Douglas in a three-way no-ropes barbed wire match, and at ECW One Night Stand two days later, where he defeated Rhyno.

Recovery and departure (2005–2006)
Sabu returned to TNA on July 29, 2005. At Sacrifice Sabu teamed with his old enemy, and then NWA World Heavyweight Champion, Raven to face Jeff Jarrett and Rhino. Rhino and Jarrett won the match after Rhino gored Raven through a table and pinned him. The match saw Abyss interfering and attacking Sabu, starting a feud between the two of them. They went on to have a match at Unbreakable in September which Abyss won after performing his Black Hole Slam finisher on to a pile of tacks in the ring. Sabu once again found himself squaring off against Rhino and Abyss, as well as Jeff Hardy, during Bound for Glory in the Monster's Ball 2 match. Rhino won the match. On the same night, Sabu competed in a ten-man Gauntlet Match to decide a number one contender, which he also lost, once again to Rhino.

Sabu continued his feud with Abyss, once again losing to him at Genesis after taking a Black Hole Slam onto a barbed wire steel chair. They met up again, in the promotion's first ever Barbed Wire Massacre at Turning Point. Sabu finally beat Abyss, but following the match was not seen on TNA television for several months. He made his return at Lockdown on April 23, 2006 in a match against Samoa Joe for Joe's TNA X Division Championship, despite Sabu having a broken forearm, a match he lost. Sabu was released soon afterwards from TNA.

World Wrestling Entertainment (2006–2007)

Shortly after his TNA release, on April 24, 2006, Sabu's official website reported that he had signed a one-year contract with World Wrestling Entertainment. At the ECW One Night Stand pay-per-view, Sabu faced Rey Mysterio for the World Heavyweight Championship. At the end of the match, Mysterio found himself standing on a ringside table with Sabu flying at him. Sabu caught the champ in a front facelock and nailed him with a DDT which caused both men to crash through the table. At this point, the WWE medical staff rushed to the injured men and declared neither man could continue and ordered the match stopped, resulting in a No Contest in which Mysterio kept his title.

On the June 13 premiere of ECW on Sci Fi, Sabu won a 10-man Extreme Battle Royal with the stipulation that the winner face John Cena at Vengeance. Sabu further fueled the feud during the next week's Raw, when he interfered in a Cena match and performed a Triple Jump Leg Drop on him, diving onto Cena and putting him through the announcers' table. Cena defeated Sabu in their "Extreme Lumberjack match" at Vengeance. On July 2, Sabu, traveling with fellow ECW wrestler Rob Van Dam, was arrested and charged with possession of drug paraphernalia, and nine Vicodin tablets following a traffic stop in Hanging Rock, Ohio following a house show in Huntington, WV. Brunk was fined $1,000 based on the guidelines of WWE's Wellness Policy. He pleaded guilty to possession of a controlled substance and the charge of possession of drug paraphernalia was dropped. He was given a suspended sentence of 10 days in jail and a $500 fine. Meanwhile, he defeated Stevie Richards in an Extreme Rules match at Saturday Night's Main Event XXXIII.

Towards the end of July, Sabu began to talk on camera for himself – instead of using a go between – and demanded a shot at Big Show's ECW World Championship which Paul Heyman refused to grant him in order to "protect" his champion. Instead, he forced him into a match against the returning Kurt Angle to determine a number one contender. When that match was interrupted by the returning Rob Van Dam another match was signed, Angle versus Van Dam versus Sabu, for the number one contendership (Angle then became too injured to compete and was pulled from the match). Sabu beat Rob Van Dam in their ladder match to win a shot at Big Show at SummerSlam, a match which he ended up losing.

At Survivor Series, Sabu teamed up with John Cena, Bobby Lashley, Rob Van Dam and Kane to face the team of The Big Show, Test, Montel Vontavious Porter, Dave Finlay and Eddie "Umaga" Fatu. Sabu eliminated Test following a Tornado DDT, but he was later eliminated by Big Show via pinfall after receiving a chokeslam. In the end, Team Cena gained victory. At December to Dismember, Sabu was originally set to appear in the main event, an Extreme Elimination Chamber match for the ECW World Championship against The Big Show, Test, Rob Van Dam, CM Punk and Bobby Lashley, but was "taken out" and replaced by Hardcore Holly. The following episode on ECW, CM Punk and Rob Van Dam got on the mic before their match with Test and Hardcore Holly and dedicated the match to Sabu. When Punk and Van Dam won the match, Paul Heyman and his security team came out and had beaten down on the two. Sabu later made his return with a heavily wrapped arm to make the save. Sabu made his Royal Rumble match debut in the 2007 Royal Rumble on January 28, where he was eliminated by Kane after receiving a chokeslam over the top rope and through a table.

Sabu joined the ECW Originals along with Rob Van Dam, Tommy Dreamer and The Sandman. The ECW Originals began a feud with the New Breed (Elijah Burke, Kevin Thorn, Marcus Cor Von and Matt Striker). The two teams faced off in a match at WrestleMania 23 in which the ECW Originals won. On the April 3 edition of ECW, the ECW Originals faced the New Breed again in a rematch, which the New Breed won after Burke performed the Elijah Express on Sabu through a table.

Sabu's final WWE match was on the May 1 episode of ECW, where he competed in a fatal four-way match against Dreamer, Van Dam and Sandman to determine the number one contender for the ECW World Championship, which Van Dam won. On May 16, 2007, Sabu was released from his WWE contract.

Independent circuit (2007–2010)

On July 13, 2007, it was announced that Sabu would be working in Mexico's AAA promotion in Mexico for their Triplemanía XV event. Sabu came out during the main event and put La Parka through a table, joining forces with the heels X-Pack, Ron "The Truth" Killings, and Konnan. Since then, he has made appearances on their major televised programs on Galavision as a minor part of Konnan's heel stable, La Legión Extranjera.

Sabu has been noted as a member of the Australasian Wrestling Federation roster, where he has so far wrestled three matches during the Wrestlefest 2007 Tour in October 2007. Sabu Defeated Il Cognito at Fairy Meadow, New South Wales on October 5, Steve Ravenous at Cardiff, New South Wales on the October 6 and finally wrestling then for the AWF Australasian Championship against Greg "TNT" Bownds to a no contest due to interference from The Platinum Players at Blacktown, New South Wales on the October 7.

On February 8, 2008, Sabu debuted as "The Crazed Kamikaze" for a brief period in CWA Pro Wrestling in Columbia, South Carolina before going back to his Sabu ring name. Teaming with then-CWA Heavyweight Champion Timber, Sabu won the match for his team after he dove off the staging area onto his opponent Phil Shatter, putting him through a table. On May 10, he was scheduled to face the new CWA Heavyweight Champion Raven in Fayetteville, North Carolina but Sabu did not show up due to injuries.

In November 2009, Sabu completed a tour of the United Kingdom representing the AWWL/BTW. On November 29, 2009, Sabu faced RVD for his AWR heavyweight championship belt in an Extreme Rules match in Oberhausen, Germany.

On October 30, 2010, Sabu defeated Damián 666 to win Xtreme Latin American Wrestling's International Championship.

Juggalo Championship Wrestling (2007–2011) 
In 2007, Sabu teamed with Insane Clown Posse to defeat Trent Acid and the Young Alter Boys at Juggalo Championship Wrestling's Bloodymania. During the second season of the company's internet wrestling show SlamTV!, Raven was involved in a feud with JCW Heavyweight Champion Corporal Robinson. In the third episode, Sabu appeared from out of the crowd and saved Robinson from an attack by Raven and his lackey Sexy Slim Goody. Raven and Goody teamed up against Robinson and Sabu in the following episode, but Raven fled from the match. At Bloodymania III, Sabu defeated Raven in a Raven's Rules match. He returned as a full-time member of the roster at Oddball Wrestling 2010, where he defeated Officer Colt Cabana in an "I Quit" match. Following two victories, Sabu teamed with The Weedman to defeat Bull Pain and Isabella Smothers at Hardcore Hell. After the match, per narrative thread, he aligned himself with villainous manager Charlie Brown. Sabu defeated heroic face 2 Tuff Tony at the next event, and continued to attack him after the match ended. He and Tony wrestled again at Up in Smoke in a match where Rob Conway was hired by Brown to attack Tony. After Rhino scared off Sabu and Conway, a tag team match was scheduled between the two and Rhino and Tony at St. Andrew's Brawl.

Return to TNA (2010)
On August 2, 2010, it was confirmed that Sabu would be taking part in TNA's ECW reunion show against TNA World Heavyweight Champion Rob Van Dam in the main event Hardcore Justice on August 8. At the event, he was defeated by former tag team partner and rival Rob Van Dam in a Hardcore Rules match. On the following edition of Impact!, the ECW alumni, known collectively as Extreme, Version 2.0 (EV 2.0), were assaulted by A.J. Styles, Kazarian, Robert Roode, James Storm, Douglas Williams and Matt Morgan of Ric Flair's  stable, who thought they didn't deserve to be in TNA. At No Surrender, Sabu unsuccessfully challenged Douglas Williams for the TNA X Division Championship. At Bound for Glory, Sabu, Tommy Dreamer, Raven, Rhino and Stevie Richards defeated Fortune members Styles, Kazarian, Morgan, Roode and Storm in a Lethal Lockdown match. On the October 21 edition of Impact!, Sabu and Rob Van Dam were defeated in a tag team match by James Storm and Robert Roode, after Sabu accidentally hit his own partner with a chair. After the match, Van Dam and Sabu began shoving each other, before being broken up by the rest of EV 2.0. At Turning Point, EV 2.0 faced Fortune in a ten-man tag team match, where each member of EV 2.0 put their TNA careers on the line. A.J. Styles won the match for his team by pinning Sabu, who as a result was fired from TNA. It had been reported earlier that Brunk's release from TNA was legitimate.

Independent circuit (2012–2021)

On January 14, 2012, Sabu returned to the former ECW Arena, when he defeated Justin Credible at an Evolve event in the venue's final professional wrestling event. In 2013, Sabu completed a UK tour, wrestling for a number of the UK's top promotions. Sabu entered the Extreme Rising World Championship tournament but was eliminated in the first round by Devon Storm.

On March 30, 2013, Sabu made his Newfoundland wrestling debut when he wrestled in the Newfoundland and Labrador based company's CEW "King Of The Rock" tournament. This was a two-show event which saw Sabu defeat multiple CEW mainstays such as CEW headliners Psycho Mitch and Krys Krysmon. Sabu ultimately lost the tournament after a brutal match with Scott Gotch in which Sabu lost intentionally at the request of CEW owner Dennis Guthrie. As a reward, CEW owner enshrined Sabu as the new CEW Newfoundland Heritage Champion. He defended his title in a Fatal Four-Way elimination match on April 1, 2013 for CEW in St. Lawrence, NL against Justin Lock, Tony King and Brandon Flip. In Scotland, Sabu challenged Jack Jester for the ICW Heavyweight Championship but was defeated. Sabu returned to ICW in 2015 to continue his feud with Jester and challenge the ICW World Heavyweight Champion Drew Galloway but was again defeated.

Sabu has also worked for Pro Wrestling Holland, where he has held the PWH Championship. On October 18, 2014, at Insurrection, Sabu defeated Balls Mahoney to win the WWL Extreme Championship. He lost the title against Monster Pain. He has also wrestled for the Big Time Wrestling independent circuit.

On November 15, 2014, Melissa Coates began accompanying Sabu to the ring as the "Super Genie". Their partnership continued until her death on June 23, 2021.

On June 5, 2015, Sabu lost a match to his long-time partner Rob Van Dam in Scranton, Pennsylvania. At the end of the match, after pinning Sabu, RVD helped him up off the mat and both raised hands together.

On August 17, 2018, Sabu lost to Nick Gage at a GCW event.

Second return to Impact Wrestling (2019) 
On February 8, 2019, it was revealed that Sabu would return to TNA, now named Impact Wrestling at their following pay-per-view, United We Stand. At the event on April 4, 2019, Sabu teamed with Rob Van Dam to face Lucha Bros (Pentagón Jr. and Fénix). Sabu wrestled some of the following television tapings, but disappeared after a while. In September it was reported that Impact was going to bring him back for more dates in the future. Just days later, Sabu wrestled Rohit Raju at the Impact television tapings in Las Vegas, in a match that went to a double countout.At Bound for Glory, Sabu competed in the Call Your Shot Gauntlet match which was won by Eddie Edwards.

Other media
He appeared in the video game ECW Hardcore Revolution, Legends of Wrestling, Legends of Wrestling II, Backyard Wrestling: Don't Try This At Home, Showdown: Legends of Wrestling, and WWE SmackDown vs. Raw 2008. Sabu's likeness also appears, albeit unofficially, in several games within the Fire Pro Wrestling franchise including Fire Pro Wrestling, Fire Pro Wrestling 2, and Fire Pro Wrestling Returns.

On September 8, 2016, Brunk guest starred on an episode of the Viceland television program, Traveling the Stars: Action Bronson and Friends Watch 'Ancient Aliens': Alien Devastation with his former tag team partner, Rob Van Dam and then manager The Super Genie.

Personal life
Brunk's father is Irish and German, and his mother is Lebanese. Brunk was married to a Japanese woman, Hitomi, on June 22, 1997, in Michigan, and had a separate Japanese ceremony on December 12, 1998, in Tokyo while in Japan for the ECW/FMW Supershow. In Forever Hardcore, Brunk reveals he took his name "Sabu" from Indian-American actor Sabu, of whom his uncle Ed Farhat was a fan.

In July 2016, Brunk was named part of a class action lawsuit filed against WWE which alleged that wrestlers incurred "long term neurological injuries" and that the company "routinely failed to care" for them and "fraudulently misrepresented and concealed" the nature and extent of those injuries. The suit was litigated by attorney Konstantine Kyros, who has been involved in a number of other lawsuits against WWE. The lawsuit was dismissed by US District Judge Vanessa Lynne Bryant in September 2018.

In the mid 2010s, Sabu began dating Melissa Coates, who also began working as his wrestling valet. Coates died in her sleep from COVID-19 complications on June 23, 2021, aged 52.

Professional wrestling style and persona

Sabu is nicknamed "The Homicidal, Suicidal, Genocidal, Death–Defying Maniac" due to his mixed style of high-flying and hardcore wrestling. Some of his moves includes using a steel chair, like the Air Sabu (a heel kick to a cornered opponent, with the assistance of a steel chair), the Arabian Facebuster (Jumping, diving or a somersault leg drop, driving a steel chair into the face of the opponent) or the Arabian Skullcrusher (jumping, diving or a somersault leg drop, driving a steel chair into the back of the opponent's head, usually through a table). Being trained by his uncle, The Original Sheik, he also uses his Arabian Clutch (a Camel clutch) as a move. His character has rarely spoken, however while working for WWE he had to do the most talking he ever did.

Sabu has been credited as a revolutionary due to his work in ECW.

Retirement
On November 5, 2021, Sabu officially announced his retirement from professional wrestling.

Championships and accomplishments

Billtown Championship Wrestling
BCW Heavyweight Championship (1 time)
Border City Wrestling
BCW Can-Am Heavyweight Championship (1 time)
Eastern Championship Wrestling/Extreme Championship Wrestling
ECW World Heavyweight Championship (2 times)
FTW Heavyweight Championship (1 time)
ECW World Television Championship (1 time)
ECW World Tag Team Championship (3 times) – with Taz (1) and Rob Van Dam (2)
Second ECW Triple Crown Champion
European Wrestling Association
EWA European Junior Heavyweight Championship (2 times)
Frontier Martial-Arts Wrestling
WWA Martial-Arts Tag Team Championship (1 time) – with Horace Boulder
Hardcore Hall of Fame
Class of 2009
International Wrestling Cartel
IWC Tag Team Championship (1 time) - with Eric Xtasy and JT Rodgers
Insane Wrestling Federation
IWF Heavyweight Championship (2 times)
Juggalo Championship Wrestling
JCW Heavyweight Championship (1 time)
Main Event Championship Wrestling
MECW APW Hardcore Championship (1 time)
NWA Florida
NWA World Heavyweight Championship (1 time)
NWA Independent World Championship (1 time)
National Wrestling Conference
NWC Heavyweight Championship (2 times)
New Japan Pro-Wrestling
IWGP Junior Heavyweight Championship (1 time)
UWA World Junior Light Heavyweight Championship (1 time)
Pro Wrestling All-Stars Of Detroit
PWASD Cruiser Core Championship (1 time)
Pro Wrestling Holland
Pro Wrestling Holland Championship (1 time)
Pro Wrestling Illustrated
Ranked No. 5 of the top 500 singles wrestlers in the PWI 500 in 1995
Ranked No. 86 of the top 500 singles wrestlers of the PWI Years in 2003
Professional Championship Wrestling
PCW Television Championship (1 time)
Pro-Pain Pro Wrestling
3PW World Heavyweight Championship (1 time)
Stampede Wrestling
Stampede Pacific Heavyweight Championship (1 time)
Total Nonstop Action Wrestling
TNA Year End Awards (1 time)
Match of the Year (2005) vs. Abyss, Barbed Wire Massacre on December 11
USA Pro Wrestling
USA Pro Heavyweight Championship (2 times)
Wawan Wrestling Championship
WWC Hardcore Championship (1 time)
Wrestling Alliance Revolution
WAR World Extreme Championship (2 times)
World Wrestling Council
WWC Hardcore Championship (1 time, final)
WWC Universal Heavyweight Championship (1 time)
Bruiser Brody Memorial Cup (2005)
World Wrestling League
WWL Extreme Championship (1 time)
Wrestling Observer Newsletter
Readers' Favorite Wrestler (1994)
Xtreme Intense Championship Wrestling
XICW Xtreme Championship (1 time)
Xtreme Latin American Wrestling
X-LAW International Championship (1 time)
Xtreme Pro Wrestling
XPW World Heavyweight Championship (1 time)

Footnotes

References

External links

 
 
 
 

1964 births
20th-century professional wrestlers
21st-century professional wrestlers
American male professional wrestlers
American people convicted of drug offenses
American people of German descent
American people of Irish descent
American people of Lebanese descent
ECW Heavyweight Champions/ECW World Heavyweight Champions
ECW Originals members
ECW World Tag Team Champions
ECW World Television Champions
Expatriate professional wrestlers in Japan
Living people
IWGP Junior Heavyweight champions
Male actors from Detroit
NWA World Heavyweight Champions
Professional wrestlers from Michigan
Professional wrestlers from New York (state)
Sportspeople of Lebanese descent
The Dangerous Alliance members
UWA World Junior Light Heavyweight Champions
WWC Universal Heavyweight Champions
FMW Brass Knuckles Tag Team Champions
XPW World Heavyweight Champions
FTW Champions